The Good Son is a 1993 American psychological thriller film directed by Joseph Ruben and distributed by 20th Century Fox. It was written by English novelist Ian McEwan. Its story follows a young boy named Mark who, after the death of his mother, is sent to stay with his aunt and uncle while his father is away on business. While there he meets his cousin Henry, who shows signs of violent and evil behavior. It stars Macaulay Culkin, Elijah Wood, Wendy Crewson, David Morse, Daniel Hugh Kelly, and Jacqueline Brookes.

The film was produced by Joseph Ruben and Mary Ann Page and was released on September 24, 1993. It grossed $12.5 million during its opening weekend and $60.6 million worldwide, against a budget of $17 million. It received negative reviews from critics and has a 25% approval rating based on 28 votes on Rotten Tomatoes.

Plot 

Twelve-year-old Mark Evans has recently experienced the death of his mother, Janice. Before leaving on a business trip to Tokyo, Mark's father Jack transports him from Arizona to his Uncle Wallace and Aunt Susan's house in Maine, where he will stay during winter break. Mark is reintroduced after a decade to his extended family, including his cousins Connie and Henry. Mark and Henry get along initially and Henry seems to be nice and well-mannered. However, Henry displays an abnormal fascination with death, making Mark feel uneasy.

Henry begins to display psychopathic behavior, which Mark is unable to address to Wallace and Susan due to Henry's threats. One of his violent actions is throwing a dummy off a bridge onto a highway, causing a massive vehicle pileup; he then plans to kill Connie. Afraid something might happen to her, Mark spends the night in her room. The next morning, Mark awakens to find Henry has taken Connie ice skating. At the pond, Henry purposely throws her towards thin ice, which collapses. Connie is rescued, but ends up in a coma.

Even though Susan does not initially believe Mark, she becomes suspicious and interrupts Henry's attempt to suffocate Connie in her hospital bed. Susan then finds a rubber duck that Henry has hidden in his shed — it had once belonged to Henry's younger brother, Richard, and had been with him in the bathtub the night he drowned; the duck went missing after. When Susan confronts Henry, he coldly reminds her that the toy had belonged to him first. He then flips and kindly asks for the rubber duck back. After a violent tug-of-war, he takes the toy and throws it down the well.

As Susan and Mark grow closer, Henry insinuates that he will kill Susan rather than let Mark continue to develop a relationship with her. When a fight breaks out between the two boys, Wallace locks Mark in the den. Henry asks a suspicious Susan to go for a walk with him, while Mark escapes and chases after them. Susan confronts Henry, asking him if he killed Richard, to which Henry sarcastically replies, "What if I did?" Susan realizes that Mark was right about her son's true nature. She tells Henry that he needs help, but he refuses and flees.

Susan gives chase and upon arriving at a cliff, Henry pushes her over the edge. As Susan dangles from a branch on the cliffside, Henry picks up a large rock to drop on her, but Mark tackles him. Susan manages to climb back up just in time to grab hold of the boys as they roll over the edge, one in each hand. Henry holds on with both hands but Mark's one-handed grip begins to slip. With only enough strength to save one of them, Susan reluctantly releases Henry and he falls to his death. Susan pulls Mark up and they look down as Henry's corpse is washed away into the ocean.

When Mark returns home to Arizona, he reflects upon Susan's choice to save him instead of Henry. He wonders if she would make the same choice again, but knows it is something that he will never ask her.

Cast

Production 
Following the completion of his novel The Child in Time, English novelist Ian McEwan was invited by 20th Century Fox to write a screenplay "about evil – possibly concerning children." McEwan recalled, "The idea was to make a low budget, high class movie, not something that Fox would naturally make a lot of money on." Despite being well received, the end result was deemed insufficiently commercial by the parties that commissioned it and it floated around Hollywood until being discovered by independent producer Mary Ann Page. Enthusiastic about the script, which was originally sent to her as a writing sample, Page tried to get the project off the ground for three and a half years. The film was briefly set up at Universal Studios, during which Brian Gilbert was attached as director. In 1988, Michael Klesic was originally cast in the role of Henry Evans. The film was soon after put on hold due to a lack of funding.

Following the successes of Home Alone and The Silence of the Lambs, which demonstrated the box-office appeal of a movie about kids and of an "extreme thriller" respectively, Fox itself chose to revisit the project, which they now saw as viable. Director Michael Lehmann (Heathers) became attached, Laurence Mark was appointed as a co-producer and McEwan was called in for rewrites. Mary Steenburgen was cast as Susan and Jesse Bradford had replaced Klesic as Henry because he had grown too old to play the part. McEwan was optimistic about the project and by November 1991, sets were being built in Maine for a production that would cost approximately $12 million. This progress was suddenly interrupted when Kit Culkin, Macaulay Culkin's father and manager, at the time a notoriously influential force in Hollywood due to the child's stardom, wanted his son to star in the film. Wishing to prove Macaulay's capacity in a dark role, he made his son's part in The Good Son a condition for his appearing in Home Alone 2: Lost in New York. Fox agreed enthusiastically due to Culkin's bankability.

As the movie was originally scheduled to shoot at the same time as Home Alone 2, the start date for The Good Son was pushed back for a year, making Steenburgen no longer available and having her replaced by Wendy Crewson but also enabling Elijah Wood's involvement. Director Lehmann and producer Mark conflicted with the imposition, leading both to leave the project. The demanding Culkin would go on to insist that Macaulay's sister, Quinn, receive a role in the film and vetted replacement director Joseph Ruben (Sleeping with the Enemy). Furthermore, the budget had risen to an estimated $20 million. McEwan found himself performing further rewrites that continued to simplify the story to satisfy Ruben's comparatively mainstream tastes and was ultimately unceremoniously removed from the project altogether when another screenwriter, Ruben's frequent collaborator David Loughery, was commissioned. Despite this, McEwan was awarded sole writing credit in arbitration when he contested a shared credit.

Principal photography took place between November 1992 and February 1993. Interiors of the Evans household were filmed in Beverly, Massachusetts, while exteriors were filmed in the Manchester-by-the-Sea village in Cape Ann and the communities of Rockport, Essex, Annisquam, Danvers, and Marblehead. The climactic cliff scene was filmed at Lake Superior’s 120-foot cliff, Palisade Head.

Release 
The Good Son was theatrically released on September 24, 1993. It was released on VHS and Laserdisc in 1994. A DVD of the film was released on September 11, 2012. A Blu-ray release of The Good Son was announced on October 25, 2016 and was released on August 1, 2017.

Elmer Bernstein's score to The Good Son was released in 1993 by Fox Music. The score was orchestrated by Emilie A. Bernstein and Patrick Russ, and featured Cynthia Millar on ondes martenot.

A tie-in novel was published alongside the movie's release in 1993, written by Todd Strasser. The novel elaborates on the movie, detailing how Henry was born a sociopath, rather than being some personification of evil. In the novel, Henry's mother Susan eventually discovers that Henry is unable to understand emotions like love and sorrow, and that pleasure derived from selfish actions and the torment of others are the few things he truly feels. The book also concludes differently from the movie, ending with Mark returning to Uncle Wallace's home in Maine one year later. Mark and Susan visit Henry's grave, which includes an epitaph: "Without Darkness There Can Be No Light".

Reception

Box office 
The Good Son earned US$44,789,789 at the North American box office revenues, and another $15,823,219 in other territories, for a total worldwide box office take of $60,613,008.

Critics 
As of August 2022, on Rotten Tomatoes, the film had an approval rating of 25% based on 28 reviews, with an average rating of 4.6/10. The site's consensus stated: "The Good Son is never good enough to live up to its unsettling potential, failing to drum up much suspense and unable to make Macaulay Culkin a credible psychopath." As of December 2020, on Metacritic, the film had a weighted average score of 45 out of 100 based on 17 reviews, indicating "mixed or average reviews". Audiences polled by CinemaScore gave the film an average grade of "B" on an A+ to F scale.

Roger Ebert, who deemed the film inappropriate for children, awarded it half a star, calling the project a "creepy, unpleasant experience". He and Gene Siskel later gave it "Two Thumbs Down". Many critics criticized the casting of Culkin because of his comedic image from Home Alone. Hal Hinson of The Washington Post stated that "the mere presence of the adorable boy star... seems to throw the whole film out of whack, making the picture play more like an inadvertent comedy than a thriller." Janet Maslin in The New York Times wrote that the end sequence at the cliff "is one of its few suspenseful and original moments" and "is quite literally gripping."

Paul Willinstein of The Morning Call described the film as "Home Alone meets Misery meets The Hand That Rocks the Cradle."

Accolades

Analysis 
John Kenneth Muir in Horror Films of the 1990s wrote that the main difference between this and The Bad Seed was that the mother character ends Henry's bad conduct, while in the latter the mother is unable to stop Rhoda Penmark.

See also 
 The Other (1972 film)
 The Bad Seed

References

External links 

 
 
 
 

1993 films
1993 drama films
1990s American films
1990s crime drama films
1990s English-language films
1990s exploitation films
1990s psychological thriller films
20th Century Fox films
Film controversies in the United Kingdom
Film censorship in the United Kingdom
Obscenity controversies in film
Film controversies
Censored films
American psychological thriller films
Filicide in fiction
Films about children
Films about cousins
Films about families
Films about juvenile delinquency
Films about mother–son relationships
Films about stalking
Films directed by Joseph Ruben
Films scored by Elmer Bernstein
Films set in Arizona
Films set in Maine
Films shot in Maine
Films shot in Minnesota
Films shot in New Hampshire
Films shot in Massachusetts
Films shot in New Mexico
Films shot in the Las Vegas Valley
Films with screenplays by Ian McEwan
Fratricide in fiction
Murder in films